Mahmud Nedim Pasha ( 1818 – 14 May 1883) was an Ottoman conservative statesman of ethnic Georgian background, who served as Grand Vizier of the Ottoman Empire between 1871–1872 and 1875–1876.

Biography 

He was the son of Mehmed Necib Pasha, a governor-general of Baghdad. After occupying various subordinate posts at the Porte, he became under-secretary of state for foreign affairs, governor-general of Damascus and İzmir (Smyrna), minister of commerce, and governor-general of Tripoli. He was also successively Minister of Justice and Minister of the Navy in 1869, and ultimately grand vizier (identical to a prime minister at this point in the Empire) twice from 1871 to 1872 and from 1875 to 1876.

He was high in favour with Sultan Abdülaziz and fell much under the influence of General Nicholas Pavlovich Ignatiev, the forceful Russian ambassador before the Russo-Turkish War (1877–78), his perceived subservience to Russia earning him the nickname of "Nedimoff". His administration was mostly unsuccessful from every point of view, and he was largely responsible for the issue of the decree suspending the interest on the Turkish funds. He was Grand Vizier and Minister of the Interior from 1879 to late 1882.

Notes

References

1818 births
1883 deaths
Government ministers of the Ottoman Empire
19th-century Grand Viziers of the Ottoman Empire
Georgians from the Ottoman Empire
Ottoman governors of Damascus
Ottoman governors of Aidin
Ottoman governors of Sidon
Ministers of Foreign Affairs of the Ottoman Empire